Chase Joseph McLaughlin (born April 9, 1996) is an American football placekicker who is a free agent. He played college football at Illinois. After going undrafted in 2019, McLaughlin spent time on five different rosters during the season, three of them as injury replacements.

College career 
McLaughlin played college football at Illinois. During his time with the Fighting Illini, McLaughlin went 79 for 79 on extra point attempts, and his senior year was 4 for 6 on field goals beyond 50 yards. Originally a walk-on, McLaughlin ended his college career as the 2019 Bakken–Andersen Kicker of the Year award winner and a First-team All-Big Ten selection. During a 2018 game against USF, McLaughlin became the first Illinois kicker to score field goals of 50 plus yards in three consecutive games. McLaughlin later achieved a school record five 50-plus yard field goals.

Professional career

Buffalo Bills
McLaughlin went undrafted in the 2019 NFL Draft, and signed with the Buffalo Bills as an undrafted free agent. He was waived on August 31, 2019.

Minnesota Vikings
McLaughlin was signed to the Minnesota Vikings practice squad on September 1, 2019. He was released on September 10.

Los Angeles Chargers
McLaughlin signed with the Los Angeles Chargers on October 1, 2019. The move was to cover for injured Chargers kicker Michael Badgley, and to give relief to Chargers punter Ty Long, who had assumed kicking duties. He was waived on October 29.

San Francisco 49ers
McLaughlin signed with the San Francisco 49ers on November 7, 2019, after kicker Robbie Gould injured his quad. In Week 10 against the Seattle Seahawks on Monday Night Football, McLaughlin made three out of four field goals in the 27–24 overtime loss. Although he made a 47-yard kick with one second left in regulation to tie the game, McLaughlin's missed field goal occurred in overtime and would have given San Francisco the victory. He was waived on December 3, 2019.

Indianapolis Colts
On December 4, 2019, McLaughlin was claimed off waivers by the Indianapolis Colts due to an injury to starter Adam Vinatieri. On December 30, 2019, McLaughlin was signed to a one-year extension through 2020. On September 5, 2020, McLaughlin was waived by the Colts during final roster cuts.

Minnesota Vikings (second stint)
On September 8, 2020, McLaughlin was signed to the Minnesota Vikings practice squad.

Jacksonville Jaguars
On November 10, 2020, the Jaguars signed McLaughlin off of the Vikings' practice squad to fill in for the injured Josh Lambo. McLaughlin was placed on the reserve/COVID-19 list by the team on November 24, 2020, and activated on November 30. McLaughlin was waived by the Jaguars after they promoted Aldrick Rosas to the active roster on December 12.

New York Jets
On December 14, 2020, McLaughlin was claimed off waivers by the New York Jets. On January 2, 2021, McLaughlin was promoted to full-time starter after the Jets' decision to cut Sam Ficken. McLaughlin was waived after the season on May 7, 2021.

Cleveland Browns
McLaughlin was claimed off waivers by the Cleveland Browns on May 10, 2021. In Week 3 of 2021 against the Chicago Bears, McLaughlin made all four field goal attempts, including a 57-yarder, as well as both of his extra points. In the 2021 season, McLaughlin finished converting 36 of 37 extra point attempts and 15 of 21 field goal attempts.

On April 5, 2022, McLaughlin re-signed with the Browns. He was waived on May 2, 2022.

Indianapolis Colts (second stint) 
McLaughlin signed with the practice squad of the Indianapolis Colts on September 13, 2022, after the team released Rodrigo Blankenship. He was promoted to the active roster on October 4. In Week 5, McLaughlin made all four field goals, including two over 50 yards, in a 12–9 win over the Denver Broncos, earning AFC Special Teams Player of the Week. He finished the 2022 season converting all 21 extra point attempts and 30 of 36 field goal attempts.

References

External links 

 Indianapolis Colts bio
 Illinois Fighting Illini football bio
 "Kicker Chase McLaughlin's faith helps him stay sane in a crazy profession!" Interview by Kent Sterling, YouTube.com, October 26, 2022. (video)

1996 births
Living people
American football placekickers
Buffalo Bills players
Cleveland Browns players
Illinois Fighting Illini football players
Indianapolis Colts players
Jacksonville Jaguars players
Los Angeles Chargers players
Minnesota Vikings players
New York Jets players
People from Cypress, Texas
Players of American football from Texas
San Francisco 49ers players
Sportspeople from Harris County, Texas